Greenfield Township may refer to:

Arkansas
 Greenfield Township, Craighead County, Arkansas, in Craighead County, Arkansas
 Greenfield Township, Monroe County, Arkansas, in Monroe County, Arkansas
 Greenfield Township, Poinsett County, Arkansas, in Poinsett County, Arkansas

Illinois
 Greenfield Township, Grundy County, Illinois

Indiana
 Greenfield Township, LaGrange County, Indiana
 Greenfield Township, Orange County, Indiana

Iowa
 Greenfield Township, Adair County, Iowa
 Greenfield Township, Calhoun County, Iowa
 Greenfield Township, Jones County, Iowa
 Greenfield Township, Warren County, Iowa

Kansas
 Greenfield Township, Elk County, Kansas

Michigan
 Greenfield Township, Michigan, defunct

Minnesota
 Greenfield Township, Minnesota

North Dakota
 Greenfield Township, Griggs County, North Dakota, in Griggs County, North Dakota
 Greenfield Township, Traill County, North Dakota, in Traill County, North Dakota

Ohio
 Greenfield Township, Fairfield County, Ohio
 Greenfield Township, Gallia County, Ohio
 Greenfield Township, Huron County, Ohio

Pennsylvania
 Greenfield Township, Blair County, Pennsylvania
 Greenfield Township, Erie County, Pennsylvania
 Greenfield Township, Lackawanna County, Pennsylvania

South Dakota
 Greenfield Township, Brown County, South Dakota, in Brown County, South Dakota

Township name disambiguation pages